The Castle of Estremoz is a medieval castle in the civil parish of Santa Maria de Devassa, municipality of Estremoz, Portuguese district of Évora.

It is classified as a National Monument.

Estremoz
Estremoz
National monuments in Évora District
Estremoz